is a subway station on the Toei Asakusa Line, operated by the Toei. It is located in Chūō, Tokyo, Japan.

Layout 
Higashi-nihombashi Station has two platforms serving two tracks. Track 1 is for passengers traveling toward Sengakuji and Nishi-magome Stations. Track 2 serves those heading toward Asakusa and Oshiage Stations.

Around the station 
The station serves the Higashi-Nihonbashi, Bakuro and Yokoyama neighborhoods.

History 
Higashi-Nihombashi Station opened on May 31, 1962, as a station on Toei Line 1. During planning, its tentative name was Kumatsucho.

In 1978, the line took its present name.

Coverage of the PASMO smart card on all privately-operated stations in the Tokyo area started on 18 March 2007.

Connections 
The station is connected with two neighboring stations on other lines by underground passages:
 Bakuroyokoyama Station on the Toei Shinjuku Line
 Bakurochō Station on the JR Sōbu Line Rapid Service

References

External links 

 Toei station information 

Railway stations in Tokyo
Toei Asakusa Line
Nihonbashi, Tokyo
Railway stations in Japan opened in 1962